Nazarbegim Muborakshoeva (born 1952) is a Tajikistani politician.

Born in Rushon, Muborakshoeva graduated in 1974 from the Tajik Agricultural Institute; in 1991 she graduated from the Communist Party High School in Tashkent. She began her career as an agronomist at a kolkhoz in Shughnon District, in 1975 becoming a member of the local Komsomol there. Beginning in that year and continuing until 1983, she was an instructor at the organization department of the Komsomol of the Gorno-Badakhshan Autonomous Region, after which she began serving as the first secretary of the Komsomol committees for Rushon and Khorugh. In 1983 she started work as a teacher at the latter city's Committee of the Communist Party of Tajikistan, continuing until 1987, when she became first secretary of the Rushon nohiya committee, a role which she held until 1991. That year she began chairing the executive committee of the nohiya's Council of People's Deputies; in 1997 she became chairwoman of the nohiya as a whole. In 2000 Emomali Rahmon appointed her by decree to the National Assembly; at its first session she was named deputy chair. She took the helm of the Khorugh city council as chair in December 2006. She has also served as mayor of Khorugh. In that capacity her name appeared in one of the cables released by WikiLeaks, in which she was revealed to have met with a representative of the United States government to discuss the cancellation of an anti-Chinese demonstration in the city.

References

1952 births
Living people
People from Gorno-Badakhshan Autonomous Region
Women local politicians
Women agronomists
Members of the National Assembly of Tajikistan
Communist Party of Tajikistan politicians
20th-century Tajikistani women politicians
20th-century Tajikistani politicians
21st-century Tajikistani women politicians
21st-century Tajikistani politicians
Women mayors of places in Tajikistan
Tajikistani  city councillors
Agronomists
Mayors of places in Tajikistan